Longwood is a historic plantation house located near Milton, Caswell County, North Carolina.  The original section was built about 1810, and is a two-story, four bay by one bay Federal style frame block.  It has a two bay wide and one bay deep Greek Revival style addition forming an overall "L"-shaped dwelling. The interior features woodwork attributed to noted African-American cabinetmaker Thomas Day. Also on the property are the frame kitchen, log corn crib, log tenant house, and log tobacco barn.  It is believed to have been the home of U.S. Congressman Romulus Mitchell Saunders early in his career.

It was added to the National Register of Historic Places in 1976.

The house was destroyed by fire on December 26, 2013.

References

Plantation houses in North Carolina
Houses on the National Register of Historic Places in North Carolina
Federal architecture in North Carolina
Greek Revival houses in North Carolina
Houses completed in 1810
Houses in Caswell County, North Carolina
National Register of Historic Places in Caswell County, North Carolina